The ancient and historic village of Pilton is today a suburb within the town of Barnstaple, one of the oldest boroughs in England. It is located about quarter of a mile north of the town centre in the English county of Devon, in the district of North Devon.  In 2009, the Pilton (Barnstaple) ward had a population of 4,239 living in some 1,959 dwellings. It has its own infants and junior school, houses one of Barnstaple's larger secondary schools, and one of Barnstaple's SEN specialist schools. North Devon Hospital is also within West Pilton parish. It has a Church Hall, two public houses, two hotels, and residential homes. It has residential estates of both private and public housing including flats. It also has a historic Church that dates back to at least the 11th Century.

It was once separated from the adjacent town of Barnstaple by the River Yeo. Sir Billy Lawrence (born c.1290 died c.1372) of Weston-Super-Mare, somewhere in, Somerset, Chief Baron of the Exchequer  built Pilton Causeway which links the town of Barnstaple and village of Pilton, which were then separated by the treacherous marshy ground in which flowed the tidal meanders of the small River Yeo. It is recounted by John Prince (1643–1723), that Stowford decided on building the causeway when on his way from his home at Stowford, north of Pilton, to Barnstaple, he met whilst fording the Yeo the drowned bodies of a woman with her child. He is also believed to have contributed to the financing of the long-bridge in Barnstaple.

History 

Pilton was originally separate from Barnstaple. Situated on an easily defended hill at the head of the Taw estuary and close to where the river narrows enough to be fordable, Pilton was an important Saxon settlement. Alfred the Great (871–899) had a fortified town, or burh, built at Pilton. According to the Burghal Hidage, an early 10th Century document setting out the details of all burhs then functioning, Pilton's wall was 1485 feet long and the nominated garrison consisted of 360 men drawn from the surrounding district in the event of an invasion. The other burhs in Devon were Exeter, Halwell (near Totnes) and Lydford; Watchet in Somerset was another burh which could provide mutual support. Pilton remained the site of the original burh through much of the 10th century until this was moved a mile or so to the south-east to become Barnstaple, probably because times were more peaceful and the burh's role as a civilian market centre had become more significant. Barnstaple was better located for trade and developed as a market town and then as a borough.  A Saxon ford would have typically been indicated by a stapol, or post – Bearda's stapol giving the town of Barnstaple its name.

The 13th century parish Church of St Mary the Virgin is a Grade I listed building. This building is used for regular services, coffee mornings and concerts.

Since 2012, the history and heritage of Pilton has been collected by a group based in Pilton Church Hall, which is compiling an archive of old and new memories, tales, documents, recordings and photographs of the people and settlement of the settlement The Pilton Story.

Leper Hospital
A history of St. Margaret's Leper Hospital at Pilton was written by the genealogist Benjamin Incledon (1730–1796), of Pilton House, whose ancient family had originated at the estate of Incledon, 3 miles north-west of Braunton. It was published in Archæologia, vol. xii. pp. 211–14.

Victorian Pilton 

White's Devonshire Directory (published 1850) described Pilton in these terms:-

Morris and Co.'s Commercial Directory and Gazetteer (published 1870) expanded this with:-

Education 
Pilton has four schools: Pathfield Special Educational Needs School (Reception – Post 16), 'Pilton Infants' (Reception – Year 2), 'Pilton Bluecoat' (Year 3 – 6), secondary school 'Pilton Community College' (Year 7 – 11). Pathfield School caters for pupils with profound or severe learning difficulties and for pupils on the autistic spectrum, serving an age range 3–19 and is a member of the SENtient Trust – a Co-operative Educational Trust. Pilton Infants is an infants school serving 5–7 year-old pupils in and around the Pilton area. At the age of 7, pupils usually proceed into the Pilton Bluecoat Junior School. Pilton Bluecoat is a junior school serving an age range of 7–11. Pupils from this school usually proceed into Pilton Community College at age 11. Pilton Community College is a coeducational secondary school serving an age range 11–16 and is also an academy.

Historic estates
The parish of Pilton contained several historic estates or manors:

Raleigh

Pilland
The estate of Pilland was held for many years by the Brett family, alias "Brighte", "Brite", etc.  Robert Brett (d.1540) was lord of the manor of Pilland and the last steward of Pilton Priory before the Dissolution of the Monasteries In 1536 following its dissolution, Robert Brett purchased the Prior's House (now called "Bull House") next to Pilton Church. Robert's daughter Joan Brett married three times, all to prominent members of the Devonshire gentry, firstly to John I Courtenay (1466–1509), lord of the manor of Molland and secondly (after 1510), as his second wife, Sir John Chichester (died 1537) lord of the manor of Raleigh in the parish of Pilton, and from her were descended the cadet branch of the Chichester family of Arlington. Joan married thirdly (after 1537) to Henry Fortescue (d.1587) of Wimpstone in the parish of Modbury, the earliest known Devonshire seat of that prominent family later created Earl Fortescue of Castle Hill, Filleigh.

The Brett family was from Whitestaunton in Somerset and had married the heiress of Pilland late in the 15th. century. The Brett family is today represented by Viscount Esher. The arms of Brett are: Or, a lion rampant between six crosses crosslet fitchy gules.

Pilton House

Pilton House was built in 1746 by Robert Incledon (1676–1758), a lawyer of New Inn, London, Clerk of the Peace and Deputy Recorder of Barnstaple and twice Mayor of Barnstaple, in 1712 and 1721. He was a member of the local ancient gentry family of de Incledon (later Incledon, pronounced "Ingleton"), which originated at the estate of Incledon, in the parish of Braunton, which family is first recorded in 1160. He was the younger of the two sons of Lewis III Incledon (1636–1699) of Buckland House, Braunton, about 5 miles to the north-west of Pilton.

Pottington
The estate of Pottington eventually was acquired by George Rolle (c.1486–1552), of Stevenstone, whose family retained it until after the death of Mark Rolle in 1907. The Rolles were responsible for much development in Pottington and after this family are named Rolle Bridge, which spans the River Yeo which separates Barnstaple from Pottington, and the Rolle Quay, on the River Yeo on the Pottington side.

Railways
From 1898 to 1935, Pilton was the main depot and operating centre for the Lynton & Barnstaple Railway. The site, a triangle of land to the East of Pilton Causeway, south of Yeo Vale Road and North of what is now the A361, was originally part of the tannery and reverted to its original ownership when the line closed. The Yard Offices were, for many years after, home to The Sheepskin Shop, and more recently used as an antiquarian furniture shop.  The carriage sheds, locomotive shed and other remnants of the railway were destroyed in a fire in 1992 and much of the site is now used for car parking.

Pilton Festival 
Pilton was granted the right to hold an annual festival by Edward III. Since it was revived in 1982, the Pilton Festival is normally held on the third weekend of July and incorporates Green Man Day. The Pilton Festival includes a parade through Barnstaple, market, craft and food stalls, live music and performances of a Green Man pageant at Pilton House. The event is non-profitmaking for the organisers, who aim to providing family fun and entertainment, celebrating the local community and helping local charities and businesses.

References

External links 

 North Devon District Council
 Pilton Community College
 Pilton Bluecoat Junior School
 Pilton Festival

Villages in Devon
Former manors in Devon